Auckland Airport  is the largest and busiest airport in New Zealand, with over 21 million passengers in the year ended March 2019. It is both a domestic and international hub for Air New Zealand, and the New Zealand hub of Jetstar.

The airport is one of New Zealand's most important infrastructure assets, providing thousands of jobs for the region. It handled 71 per cent of New Zealand's international air passenger arrivals and departures in 2000. It is one of only two commercial airports in New Zealand (the other being Christchurch) capable of handling Boeing 747 and Airbus A380 aircraft.

The airport has a single  runway, 05R/23L, which is Cat IIIb capable (at a reduced rate of movements) in the 23L direction. It has a capacity of about 45 flight movements per hour, and is currently the busiest single-runway airport in Oceania. In November 2007 work began on a new northern runway, to be built in several stages and to be used mainly by smaller aircraft, freeing up capacity on the main runway. The project was put on hold for at least 12 months in October 2009, however, and deferred for a further few years in August 2010 following consultation with airlines and a review of capacity management options. The timing of the recommencement of construction of the second runway will be demand driven relative to the capacity of the existing runway. The expected completion date for the second runway is now 2025.

History

Overview
The site of the airport was first used as an airfield by the Auckland Aero Club. In 1928, the club leased some land from a dairy farmer to accommodate the club's three De Havilland Gypsy Moths. The club president noted at the time that the site "has many advantages of vital importance for an aerodrome and training ground. It has good approaches, is well drained and is free from power lines, buildings and fogs." Prior to rebuilding, this was known as Mangere Aerodrome.

From 1948, the RNZAF Base Auckland at Whenuapai served as the civilian airport for Auckland. This was chosen, despite the hills adjacent to Whenuapai limiting the ability of newer aircraft to use the facilities, to the lack of cost to the Auckland City Council, as the site was already established as an RNZAF base. A September 1948 report by Sir Frederick Tymms recommended that Whenuapai Airport be replaced with a larger purpose-built airport located in either Māngere or Pakuranga. In 1958, the New Zealand Government commissioned Leigh Fisher Associates to survey and design the international airport at Māngere.

In 1960 work started to transform the site into Auckland's main airport. Much of the runway is on land reclaimed from the Manukau Harbour. The first flight to leave was an Air New Zealand DC-8 in November 1965, bound for Sydney. The airport was officially opened the following year, with a 'grand air pageant' on Auckland Anniversary weekend, 29 to 31 January 1966.

Qantas commenced the first scheduled Boeing 747 service out of Auckland on Friday 8 December 1972.

A new international terminal, named after Jean Batten, was built in 1977. Prior to this, all flights used what is now the domestic terminal. In 2005, the international terminal was altered, separating arriving and departing passengers.

Expansion
Previously taxiway 'Alpha' (parallel to the main runway) had been modified and designated as Runway 23R/05L so that rehabilitation work could be completed on the main runway 23L/05R. After the work was completed, the temporary runway reverted to taxiway alpha, although the main runway retained its L/R designations. In 2007, construction began on a second runway to the north of the current one. This would have cost $32 million and would have improved the efficiency of the airport by removing smaller planes (which require longer separation distances from the air turbulence wakes of preceding jet airliners) from the main runway. In August 2009, however, the project was put on hold due to a downturn in air travel, and later in 2010 the project was suspended.

Construction for Stage One started in November 2007. Eventually a new domestic terminal would also be built to the north to better utilise the new runway. The new runway will thus free up the longer southern runway to handle more heavy jet operations. The ten-year project would cost NZ$120 million, not including substantial extensions planned for the airport arrivals/departure buildings and associated structures.

It currently has two gates, both capable of handling Airbus A380 aircraft. In May 2009, Emirates became the first airline to fly the A380 to Auckland, using the aircraft on its daily Dubai–Sydney–Auckland route.

On 2 October 2012 Emirates began operating the Dubai–Melbourne–Auckland with an A380, having previously operated the route with a B777-300ER. From 2 October 2013, the A380 took over from a B777-300ER on the Dubai–Brisbane–Auckland route This will mean that Emirates now serves Auckland solely with A380s, and Auckland Airport becomes the only airport in the world, other than Dubai, to have three scheduled Emirates A380s on the ground at the same time. In 2014, Singapore Airlines was the second airline to operate A380s at the airport.

In 2013, the domestic terminal undertook a series of upgrades costing a total of $30 million. Stage one ran from January 2013 to March 2013, and involved changes to the drop off points and roads outside the terminal. In the second half of 2013, the baggage claim belts were lengthened, parts of the apron was changed, and new corridors were connected to the jetbridges. The two different sides to the terminals now share a centralised security screening area following the upgrade and an extra storey was added to the western wing to provide an airside connection between the Air New Zealand side of the terminal and the Jetstar side of the terminal. The work took 12 months to complete.

In early 2014, the airport released their 30-year vision for the future, which envisaged the airport to combine both the international and domestic operations into one combined building based around the existing international terminal. This will see new domestic piers built to the south of the existing international precinct within the next 5 years. The plan also allows for the extension of the current international piers and also the creation of new piers for international operations. A new 2,150 metres long northern runway will be able to cater for aircraft up to the size of the 777 and 787 jets. New public transport links including a new railway station and line may be built in the future. The plan has been split into four implementation phases. Phase 1 will see all operations combined into one terminal precinct as well as improved road network surrounding the terminal within the next five years. Phase 2 sees the new northern runway constructed as well as the extension of the terminal forecourt by 2025. Phase 3 involves the extension of both international and domestic piers by 2044.

From the 2015 Annual Report, work will commence on extending Pier B in the current financial year. This project will allow for three more gates to be built. This will double, from three to six, the number of A380 aircraft Auckland Airport can accommodate at any one time. Also, it will increase the number of B787-9 aircraft that can be accommodated from six to nine. This development has been requested by airlines for greater capacity, in the future 4 more gates will be built on the northern side of Pier B.

In early 2022, construction will begin on a new domestic terminal that will merge onto the existing international terminal to the east.

Terminals

Auckland Airport consists of two terminals; the International Terminal and the Domestic Terminal. The two terminals are located approximately 500m apart and are connected by a free shuttle bus service and a signposted walkway. The airport has 65 gates in total, 23 with Jetbridges and 42 remote stands for aircraft parking.

International terminal
Check-in counters occupy the eastern end of the ground floor of the International Terminal.

Gates 1–10 are located in Pier A; Gates 1–9 are single-airbridge gates and Gate 10 is a twin-airbridge gate suitable for an A380 aircraft, but not two narrow body aircraft.
Gates 15 to 18 are located in Pier B, and are twin airbridges gates, each capable of handling an A380 aircraft with simultaneous double-deck boarding, or two narrow body aircraft each in the A320 or B737 class.
Gates 4A, 4B, 4C, 4D, 16A, 16B, 16C and 16D are bus gates used when passengers need to be transported to aircraft parked at remote stands.
Gates 4A and 4B are located on the eastern side of Pier A, and 4C and 4D are located on the western side of Pier A. They are accessed from the lounge for gates 2 & 4.
Gate 4E is used for groups requiring special handling such as sporting teams.
Stand 19 is a remote stand located west of Pier B. In December 2015, the airport opened a new bus lounge in Pier B (gates 16A and 16B) for bussing to stands on the western apron, particularly stands 19 and 74–81.
Stands 70–73 and 82–84 are remote stands located to the east of Pier A. If boarding of aircraft is necessary at these stands, passengers are bussed from gate 4A or 4B. Stands 70–73 were also used by Jetstar regional flights from 2016 to 2019 and passengers were bussed from the domestic bus lounge (gate 62 and 63).
Stands 74–81 are remote stands located to the west of Pier A. If boarding of aircraft is necessary at these stands, passengers are bussed from gate 4C or 4D, or 16A or 16B.

Passenger separation
In 1993, the CAA instituted the requirement that all international airports in New Zealand must keep airside departing and arriving passengers separate. Auckland Airport was granted an exemption to this rule, allowing the airside mingling of arriving and departing passengers to continue, on the basis that all international flights operating into Auckland originated from airports with adequate security screening. Following the September 11 attacks and further regulation by the ICAO, the CAA required the airport to physically separate arriving and departing passengers by 2006. In the interim period until passenger separation was achieved, flights to the US as well as all Qantas, and for a short time Cathay Pacific, flights were restricted to departing from gates where a secondary X-ray and metal detector inspection was operating.

To physically separate arriving and departing passengers, Auckland Airport decided to build a new departure level on top of the existing one, with the existing floor becoming the arrivals level. The existing departure lounges were kept by installing glass walls to separate the waiting areas from the newly designed arrivals corridor, and escalators were installed to transport passengers from the new departures level down to each departure lounge. The modifications to the terminal were completed in December 2005, and also involved the expansion of retail space within the pier by 600 square metres and an increase in the number of bus gates to four.

Domestic terminal
The two previously separate domestic terminal buildings have now been connected by a common retail area. The Jetstar check-in area is located in the western end of the terminal, in the building previously used by Ansett New Zealand, Qantas, and Pacific Blue. The Air New Zealand check-in area is located in the centre of the terminal. There are nine gates that have jetbridges in the domestic terminal.

Jetstar domestic A320 services operate from gates 20–23 (jetbridge gates). Gate 24 (tarmac gate) is used by both Jetstar and Air New Zealand's A320 aircraft. Gates 60–63 were used for Jetstar regional flights, with 62 and 63 being bus gates in a separate building at the Jetstar end of the terminal. Gates 20 and 21 were turned into 60 and 61 during peak regional times. Air New Zealand mainline services operate from gates 24–33. Gates 28 through to 33 all have jetbridges, while gates 25, 26 and 27 don't exist. Air New Zealand Link services operate from the regional section of the domestic terminal. This is located at the eastern end of the terminal and consists of gates 34–50 (excluding gate numbers 37, 38 and 44, which do not exist). These gates are linked to the terminal by covered walkways, and passengers walk across the apron to the aircraft.

Gates 51–59 are used by third-level operators Air Chathams, Alliance Airlines, and Barrier Air. Further to the east, gates 101–106 are used for Business Jets and long-term parking.

Airlines and destinations
Auckland connects to 26 domestic and 49 international destinations in North and South America, Asia, Oceania and the Middle East. Air New Zealand operates the most departures from the airport followed by Jetstar and Qantas.

Passenger

Cargo

Statistics

Company

Shareholders

Auckland International Airport Limited (AIAL) was formed in 1988, when the New Zealand Government corporatised the airport. It had previously been run by the Auckland Regional Authority, covering the five councils in the Auckland region.

The Government was AIAL's majority shareholder, the rest being held by the local councils. In 1998 the Government sold its shareholding, and AIAL became the fifth airport company in the world to be publicly listed. At that time the major shareholders were Auckland City Council (25.8 per cent), Manukau City Council (9.6 per cent) and North Shore City Council (7.1 per cent). North Shore City Council sold its shares in 1999 and Auckland City Council sold its share down to 12.8 per cent in 2002. After amalgamation into the Auckland Council, the local authority now owns a 22.4 per cent stake worth $1.13 billion as of May 2014.

AIAL appears on the New Zealand Stock Exchange and Australian Stock Exchange. International shareholders hold around 40 per cent of the shares, domestic approximately 60 per cent. The company has a Standard & Poor's credit rating of A+/Stable/A-1.

As at 31 December 2015, Auckland Airport was the biggest listed company on the NZX, with a market capitalisation of $6.85 Billion NZD.

Revenue 

AIAL enjoys diverse revenue streams, and operates a 'dual-till' approach, whereby its finances are split into aeronautical and non-aeronautical balance sheets. Aeronautical income is derived from airfield charges, terminal services charge and the airport development charge (or departure fee). Non-aeronautical revenue comes from its significant property portfolio, car park, and retail income. Due to the airport having little-to-no competition, the aeronautical side of the business is subject to information disclosure requirements as set by the Commerce Commission. Income from the non-aeronautical side of the business accounts for just over half of its revenue. The airport has been criticised by airlines, led by Air New Zealand, for its purportedly high landing charges. Research conducted in September 2010 by aviation consultants Jacobs, however, indicates that Auckland Airport international charges are slightly below the average of the 20 largest international airports flown by Air New Zealand.

The diversity in revenue was of benefit during the downturn in international aviation following the events of 11 September 2001, and subsequently the 2002 Bali bombings, SARS outbreak and the Iraq War. The airport was able to rely on steady income from the non-aeronautical side of the business, which softened the blow of international events.

In July 2009 Auckland Airport elected to delay a scheduled increase in its landing charges from 1 July 2009 to assist its airline customers during the recession. The scheduled increase was put in place on 1 March 2010. The company has in the past reportedly been singled out by airline lobby group IATA for its consistent excessive level of profits. Airlines such as Air New Zealand complain of excessive landing charges. On 5 June 2007, the airport's 60 per cent profit margin was criticised by IATA director general and CEO Giovanni Bisignani. He said the airport had a "happy monopoly" and that IATA would ask the New Zealand government to investigate.

Until July 2008, AIAL charged all departing international passengers (12 years old or older) a $25 departure fee. This has been replaced with a passenger services charge levied on the airlines for each arriving and departing international passenger. This charge has commenced at $13 and was planned to rise by 50 cents a year for two years to $14.
In 2012, Auckland Airport envisaged to cut the international passenger fee and hike the domestic travellers charges in FY-2013.

Partnership with Queenstown Airport
On 8 July 2010, AIAL announced it had entered into an agreement to take a 24.99 per cent shareholding in Queenstown Airport Corporation Limited, the operator of Queenstown Airport, and form a strategic alliance between the two airports. The shareholding will cost NZ$27.7 million, through the issue of new shares. The alliance is expected to generate an extra 176,000 passengers through Queenstown Airport. AIAL has an option to increase its shareholding in Queenstown Airport to 30–35 per cent at any time up to 30 June 2011, subject to the approval of the Queenstown Lakes District Council. The new share capital from would allow Queenstown Airport to fund growth of the airport's operating capacity and to pay regular dividends back to the community via the Queenstown Lakes District Council shareholding.

Radio
Auckland Airport owned radio frequencies over a 15-year period. It purchased the Radio Hauraki frequency 1476 AM in 1990, and began operating adult contemporary and flight information radio station Info Music from the domestic terminal. It purchased 1XD Counties Manukau L Double L and its 1404 AM, 1548 AM and 702 AM frequencies in 1992, and changed the station name to Info Music Counties 1476 and then Airport Radio AKL1476. The 1476 frequency was leased to Independent Broadcasting Company in 1993, which used it at various times for Auckland 1476, The Breeze on 91, Lifestyle Radio, and Today 99.8FM. It was leased to talkback station The Point 1XD in 1994, and made available to Auckland Radio Trust to rebroadcast the BBC World Service in 1998. It was sold in 2005.

Ground transportation

Road
Two state highways connect to the airport; State Highway 20A and State Highway 20B. State Highway 20A leaves the airport to the north along George Bolt Memorial Drive and travels through Māngere as an expressway before joining State Highway 20. State Highway 20B leaves the airport to the east and crosses Pūkaki Creek before travelling along Puhinui Road to an interchange with State Highway 20 in Wiri.

Public transport
 SkyBus express buses operate between both terminals at the airport and central Auckland and North Harbour. The terminus for central Auckland services is the Britomart Transport Centre via Mount Eden Station or Dominion Road and Queen Street. The Westfield Albany mall is the terminus for North Harbour services via the Northern Busway with stops at the Akoranga and Smales Farm stations.
 The Airport Link is a Bus Rapid Transit-lite service that connects the airport to Puhinui Railway Station. This service is the first stage of an eventual full BRT line from the Airport to Botany Town Centre
 Park & Ride bus service is available for short-term and long-term parking. It is located 10 - 15 minutes from the domestic and international terminals. The park and ride service is also used by the majority of airport staff.

Rail proposals

A heavy rail connection from the airport to Auckland CBD was initially conceived as an extension of the Onehunga Branch line via Māngere Bridge and the suburb of Māngere. Another proposal was the construction of a heavy rail line to the east of the airport to connect with the North Island Main Trunk line near Puhinui Station, or the creation of a loop to connect the airport to both the Onehunga Line and the North Island Main Trunk Line.

The preferred option since 2016 is an entirely new light rail line running from the airport to central Auckland via a direct alignment through Mangere, Onehunga and Mount Roskill. At Mount Roskill, it would connect to the planned Dominion Road light rail line which would continue on to Queen Street in Central Auckland before reaching a final terminus in the Wynyard Quarter waterfront development area.

Cycling
There are several cycle routes connecting the airport to the surrounding suburbs, consisting of both off-road tracks and on-road cycle lanes.

Accidents and incidents
Accidents and incidents that occurred at or near Auckland Airport include:
4 July 1966 – an Air New Zealand Douglas DC-8 on a training flight crashed on the runway shortly after taking off, killing 2 of the 5 crew (no passengers were on board).
17 February 1979 – Air New Zealand Flight 4374 crashed into Manukau Harbour while on final approach. 1 crew and 1 company staff member were killed.
31 July 1989 – an Air Freight NZ Convair 340/580 crashed shortly after taking off at night. All 3 crew members were killed.

Demographics

Auckland Airport had a population of 630 at the 2018 New Zealand census, an increase of 63 people (11.1%) since the 2013 census, and a decrease of 180 people (−22.2%) since the 2006 census. There were 150 households, comprising 321 males and 306 females, giving a sex ratio of 1.05 males per female. The median age was 35.6 years (compared with 37.4 years nationally), with 135 people (21.4%) aged under 15 years, 126 (20.0%) aged 15 to 29, 327 (51.9%) aged 30 to 64, and 42 (6.7%) aged 65 or older.

Ethnicities were 31.4% European/Pākehā, 49.0% Māori, 19.5% Pacific peoples, 19.5% Asian, and 1.4% other ethnicities. People may identify with more than one ethnicity.

The percentage of people born overseas was 24.3, compared with 27.1% nationally.

Although some people chose not to answer the census's question about religious affiliation, 45.7% had no religion, 36.2% were Christian, 5.7% had Māori religious beliefs, 3.3% were Hindu, 2.4% were Muslim, 1.0% were Buddhist and 3.3% had other religions.

Of those at least 15 years old, 66 (13.3%) people had a bachelor's or higher degree, and 69 (13.9%) people had no formal qualifications. The median income was $36,600, compared with $31,800 nationally. 75 people (15.2%) earned over $70,000 compared to 17.2% nationally. The employment status of those at least 15 was that 306 (61.8%) people were employed full-time, 51 (10.3%) were part-time, and 15 (3.0%) were unemployed.

See also
 Auckland Airport Line (proposed)
 List of airports in New Zealand
 List of airlines of New Zealand
 List of the busiest airports in New Zealand
 Transport in New Zealand

References

External links

Photographs of Auckland Airport held in Auckland Libraries' heritage collections
"Documenting the new Auckland Airport" at the website of Auckland Museum

Transport companies of New Zealand
Airports in New Zealand
Airports established in 1928
Buildings and structures in Auckland
Airfields of the United States Army Air Forces Air Transport Command in the Pacific Ocean Theater
Companies based in Auckland
Economy of Auckland
Defunct radio stations in New Zealand
1928 establishments in New Zealand
Transport buildings and structures in the Auckland Region
Māngere-Ōtāhuhu Local Board Area
International airports in New Zealand